Superworld is a superhero-themed role-playing game published by Chaosium in 1983 that uses the generic Basic Role-Playing rules system. The game began as just one part of the Worlds of Wonder product before being published as a stand-alone game. In competition against other well-established and popular superhero games, Superworld never found an audience, and was discontinued after only three supplements were published for it.

Game system
Superworld uses Chaosium's Basic Role-Playing system, with the addition of rules for super-powers.

Components
The game box contains 
three rules booklets
 "Superheroes Book" (32 pages): character creation rules, the game system itself, and two character sheets with a male and female standing silhouette.
 "Superpowers Book" (40 pages): the Powers available to the characters, Advantages and Disadvantages that can be applied to them, and Disabilities that can affect the character. The interior covers have two more character sheets, this time with silhouettes of a male and female in flight.
 "Gamemasters Book" (40 pages): various aspects of a campaign, the legal system, animals, and the creation of organizations adapted to a superhero universe, with three specific examples: FIRE for Free Investigatory Research Enterprise, FORCE for Federal Organization for the Registration and Certification of Exotics, and the Omega Institute. The "Gamemasters Book" also includes two scenarios: "Deadly Devices of Doctor Dread", which pits a team of heroes against the Dr. Dread of the title and his subordinates, and "The Haunting", which describes a mysterious and ancient tome desired by a mystical super-villain.
 a booklet of character sheets, 
a booklet of tables for the Gamemaster, 
 a page of cardboard figure silhouettes to be cut out, 
 some 6-sided, 8-sided, and 20-sided dice. 
Editions printed in 1984 and later also contain a 4-page booklet of errata.

Character generation
Characters are generated by rolling two six-sided dice and adding 6, to produce scores for Strength, Constitution, Size, Intelligence, Power, Dexterity, and Appearance. The sum of these characteristics gives a total of Hero Points used to buy super powers. Hero Points can also be used to buy skills or increase characteristics. It is possible to earn more Hero Points by choosing a Disability such as Public Identity, Vulnerability to a Substance, or Psychological Problems. More Hero Points are awarded for experience at the end of each game session.

The super powers system imitates the system used in Hero Games' Champions superhero game, where powers are described by their effects, not by their causes. For example, the player does not buy "Laser Vision" to cause an energy blast, but instead buys the effect "Energy Blast", which specifies that it caused by a laser beam emitted by the hero's eyes. Each effect can be modified by Advantages (less energy expenditure, for example) or Disadvantages (reduced number of uses, for example) which increase or reduce the cost of a power.

Skills resolution
As with all games using the Basic Role-Playing rules, skill tests and combat are resolved by rolling percentile dice against skills. Rolls that are much lower than needed can result in increased effect, while high rolls can cause critical failures. Combat rules have many options and take into account three types of energy for damage: Kinetic, Electric, and Radiation.

Publication history
In 1982, Chaosium published World of Wonders to demonstrate the flexibility of its generic Basic Role-Playing System; the game included three separate settings with the idea that player characters could be moved from setting to setting using the same rules system: 
 a fantasy setting called Magic World
 a science fiction setting, "Future World"
 a modern-day superhero setting, Superworld

The following year, Superworld was published as a stand-alone boxed set designed by Steve Perrin, with interior illustrations by Chris Marrinan, Markus Harrison, and cover art by Michael Dooney.

Three supplements followed:
Trouble for HAVOC (1984), three linked Superworld adventures by Stephen Perrin, Yurek Chodak, Donald Harrington, and Charles Huber. The adventures could be converted for use with rival superhero games Villains & Vigilantes or Champions. 
Bad Medicine for Dr. Drugs (1984), a Superworld adventure by Ken Rolston: Teen-aged heroes try to uncover a drug distribution ring in their high school after a classmate dies of an overdose. The adventure could be converted for use with Champions.
Superworld Companion (1985), a rules supplement that included new super powers, a detailed plan of a superhero base, and effects of climate on play.

Up against well-established rival superhero games Villains & Vigilantes (Fantasy Games Unlimited) and Champions (Hero Games), Superworld was not able to establish a strong player base, and no further supplements were released by Chaosium.

Reception
Jon Sutherland reviewed Superworld for White Dwarf #51, giving it an overall rating of 7 out of 10, and stated that "This represents an intelligent attempt to provide a playable format for a difficult topic to simulate. The only rules that I have ever seen with anything like this in scope was the Golden Heroes FRP which may soon be available in a modified form from GW."

Steve Marsh reviewed Superworld in Ares Magazine #17 and commented that "The game is anything but chaotic, but should create change in any gaming group that sees it. It is well done, and worth the price."

Crede Lambard reviewed Superworld in Space Gamer No. 70. Lambard commented that "Superworld is very good. I doubt that it will ever supplant Champions, but it certainly supplements it . . . especially now that both Hero Games and Chaosium are putting out adventures with stats for both games."

Reviews
Different Worlds #33 (March/April, 1984)

Wild Cards
The Wild Cards series of science fiction books came from a Superworld campaign gamemastered by George R. R. Martin, and played in by other science fiction writers.

See also
 Metahuman
 George RR Martin

References 

Basic Role-Playing System
Role-playing games introduced in 1983
Steve Perrin games
Superhero role-playing games